State Route 540 (SR 540) is an east–west state highway in the western portion of the U.S. state of Ohio. SR 540 has its western terminus in downtown Bellefontaine at a signalized intersection with U.S. Route 68 (US 68) and SR 47.

Route description
The entirety of SR 540 is situated within the eastern portion of Logan County.  There are no stretches of SR 540 that are included within the National Highway System (NHS).  The NHS is a network of routes identified as being most important for the nation's economy, mobility and defense.

History
The SR 540 designation was assigned in 1937. In 1937, CR 25, along with SR 540 between CR 25 and downtown Bellfontaine, was a part of SR 32, which would become US 33 one year later.  

By 1964, US 33 was routed onto its current alignment around the east side of Bellefontaine.  Consequently, the former portion of US 33 from the previous western terminus of SR 540 west into downtown Bellefontaine became a westward extension of SR 540 which resulted in the highway taking on its present shape.

Major intersections

References

External links

 Logan County Highway Map

540
Transportation in Logan County, Ohio
U.S. Route 33